Gota or Gøta or Göta may refer to:

People 
Gotabaya Rajapaksa (born 1949), 8th President of Sri Lanka
, Japanese freestyle skier
Gota Yashiki (born 1962), both an independent acid jazz artist and drum/bass player, as a member of the band Simply Red
Gota Yamashita (born 1989), Japanese mixed martial artist

Places 
Gota, Gujarat, a city in India
Göta älv, a river in Sweden
Gota, Guinea, a town in the Nzérékoré Prefecture, Guinea
Gotha, Ethiopia, also known as Gota, a settlement in east-central Ethiopia
Göta Canal, a waterway in Sweden
Gota (Dârjov), a tributary of the river Dârjov in Olt County, Romania
Göta, Sweden, locality situated in Västra Götaland County
Norðragøta, also just referred to as Gøta, village on Eysturoy, Faroe Islands

Names 
Göta, Swedish female name
Gota Cola, a three piece band from Brisbane
Göta Lejon, a theatre in Stockholm, Sweden, located in Södermalm
Göta Ljungberg (1898–1955), major Swedish Wagnerian soprano of the 1920s
Göta Anti-Aircraft Corps Commemorative Medal, a commemorative medal of the former Swedish Göta Anti-Aircraft Corps
Göta Pettersson (1926–1993), Swedish gymnast and Olympic champion
Göta älvbron, a bascule bridge in central Gothenburg, Sweden, carrying normal road vehicles and trams
Göta Artillery Regiment, a Swedish Army artillery regiment that traced its origins back to the 17th century, disbanded in 1962
Göta highway, an ancient road between Stockholm and the south of Sweden
Göta Engineer Battalion, Swedish Army engineer regiment
Göta Signal Battalion, Swedish Army signal regiment, disbanded in 1997
GÍ Gøta, a former football club based in Gøta, in the Faroe Islands

Other uses 
GoTa, "Global Open Trunking Architecture" a cellular-based digital trunking system
Gota (embroidery), a type of Indian embroidery
Gota (mixture), a tasty digestive mixture of saunf, coconut and other spices
Game of Thrones Ascent, a strategy video game

See also 
 Gotha (disambiguation)

Japanese masculine given names